Ralf Richter is a former East German figure skater.

Results

References

East German figure skaters
Living people
Year of birth missing (living people)